Jérôme Guery (born 24 July 1980) is a Belgian Olympic show jumping rider. He competed at the 2016 Summer Olympics in Rio de Janeiro, Brazil, where he finished 28th in the individual competition with the horse Grand Cru van de Rozenberg. At the 2020 Summer Olympics in Tokyo, having finished 13th in the Individual jumping, he was a member of the Belgian team in the team jumping competition which his team, composed of Devos and Wathelet, finished in third place, giving Belgium its first equestrian medal since the 1976 Summer Olympics.

International Championship Results

References

External links
 
 
 
 

1980 births
Living people
Belgian male equestrians
Olympic equestrians of Belgium
Olympic medalists in equestrian
Olympic bronze medalists for Belgium
Equestrians at the 2016 Summer Olympics
Equestrians at the 2020 Summer Olympics
Medalists at the 2020 Summer Olympics
21st-century Belgian people